Cecil Turner (born April 2, 1944) is an American former professional football player who was a wide receiver for six seasons for the Chicago Bears of the National Football League (NFL). He went to the Pro Bowl after the 1970 season, when he tied a record (set in 1967 by Green Bay's Travis Williams) by returning four kickoffs for touchdowns, a record that still stands.

Early life 
Turner graduated from Spingarn High School in Washington D.C.

College career 
Turner started his college career as a track & field standout. Competing for Pratt College, he won the 1964 NJCAA 100-yard dash title, with a time of 9.5 seconds at the meet hosted in Big Spring, Texas. He continued to excel in track after transferring to Cal Poly San Luis Obispo, bettering his time to 9.3 seconds and ultimately leading the Mustangs to the 1968 NCAA College Division outdoor track and field team national title.

Midway through his senior football season for Cal Poly, Turner was hailed as "the fastest college football player in the nation," as he accumulated four touchdowns through the first four games of the year, but he missed most of the rest of the fall of 1967 due to injury. 

Turner, whose top college football season as a junior included 16 catches for 366 yards (a 22.9-yard average) and two touchdown receptions (plus an 87-yard kickoff return for a TD) in 1966, was later elected to the Cal Poly Hall of Fame in 1989.

Professional career 
Turner was selected in the fifth round of the 1968 NFL/AFL Draft by the Chicago Bears.

Larry Mayer ranked Turner as the seventh-greatest return specialist in Bears history on the team's official website, noting his 32.7-yard average for the 1970 season. In 2010, Bleacher Report selected Turner as an honorable mention in the kickoff return position to their all-time Bears team, with the spot going to Gale Sayers.

References

External links
 Football Database

1944 births
Living people
American football return specialists
American football wide receivers
Cal Poly Mustangs football players
Chicago Bears players
Florida Blazers players
National Conference Pro Bowl players
Players of American football from Washington, D.C.